Lady Margaret School is an all-girls' Church of England secondary school in Parsons Green, Fulham, London.  It was awarded specialist school status (a government funding scheme defunct since 2010) as a Mathematics & Computing College in September 2003, and became an academy in September 2012. In September 2017 it celebrated its 100th anniversary. Princess Alexandra is patron of the centenary having previously opened the new assembly hall in 1965. Princess Alexandra attended a service to celebrate the centenary of Lady Margaret School at Westminster Abbey (the resting place of Lady Margaret Beaufort) on Tuesday 17 October 2017. The service was conducted by the Dean of Westminster, John Hall.

Now
The school has approximately 742 girls aged between 11 and 18 years, about 175 of whom are in the sixth form. The majority of girls stay on into the sixth form. A number of students from other schools are given places in the sixth form following its expansion with the opening of the purpose-built Olivier Centre in 2010.

The headteacher is Elisabeth Stevenson, following the retirement of Sally Whyte in July 2015.

Today Lady Margaret School is a Church of England academy in the London Borough of Hammersmith and Fulham. In 2003 the school achieved specialist status in mathematics and computing. In 2007 the school was described by Ofsted as 'good with outstanding features' and by the Statutory Inspection of Anglican Schools as 'outstanding'.

In 2010, the school opened a new building named 'The Olivier Centre', named after the former headmistress, Joan Olivier. The auditorium there was named after Colin Busby, a deputy head who also retired in 2006.

It was reviewed again in 2011, with Ofsted describing the school as 'outstanding'. Having been designated a 'high performing specialist school' following the successful Ofsted inspection, the school was awarded a second specialism in music.

In December 2012 the school was given the go-ahead by Hammersmith and Fulham Council to expand to permanently admit four forms of entry in year 7 following the success of two earlier 'bulge' years. From September 2014 the school admitted four forms (120 pupils) in year 7.

In December 2016, the Statutory Inspection of Anglican and Methodist Schools (SIAMS) conducted an inspection to evaluate the distinctiveness and effectiveness of the school as a church school. The report judged the school to be ‘Outstanding’ in all categories.

History
Lady Margaret School has its origins in Whitelands College School, founded in 1842, a year after the creation of Whitelands College, one of the oldest higher education institutions in England. The latter was founded by the Church of England's National Society as a teacher training college for women. The college was named after its first home, a Georgian building, Whitelands House, on King's Road in Chelsea, London.

In 1917, Whitelands School was threatened with closure, and it was only by the strenuous efforts of Enid Moberly Bell and her staff that a substantial number of the pupils were "rescued", forming Lady Margaret School that September. Records in The National Archives suggest that Enid Moberly Bell was its founding headmistress. The school was named after the Lady Margaret Beaufort, mother of Henry VII, founder of St John's and Christ's Colleges, Cambridge, and a benefactress of education.

The school began life in the oldest of the three houses facing Parsons Green which now form the present school: Belfield House. In 1937, the second house, Elm House, was purchased through the generosity of Anne Lupton (died 1967) and was renamed Lupton House.

The school was for many decades a fee-paying school. However, with the passing in 1944 of the "Butler Act", which introduced free secondary education in the UK, the school's kindergarten and junior school were phased out and Lady Margaret became a two-form entry grammar school. In April 1951 its relationship to the Church of England was regularised when it became a voluntary aided school. It became a comprehensive school on its 60th Anniversary in September 1977.

Houses 
There are six houses in the school: Moberly Bell and Marshall joined the four original houses in 2001/02.
Three of the six houses are named after women and the other three are after men. They are as follows:
Moberly-Bell, (named after Enid Moberly-Bell, first headmistress of LMS) (pink),
Lyttelton (after Edward Lytelton, a benefactor of the school) (blue),
Carver (named after an early benefactor of the school, Gertrude Carver, who was also a close family friend of Enid Moberly Bell) (green),Marshall (Florence Marshall, a  previous headmistress)(purple),
Chirol (Sir Valentine Chirol, a benefactor of the school) (red) and
Kensington (the Bishop of Kensington) (yellow).

Notable former pupils
 Louise Alder – soprano
 Laura Barnett – author and journalist
 Mahalia Belo – film director
 Jessie Burton – actress and writer
 Martha Fiennes – film director
 Jill Saward, rape law reformist, aka the Ealing Vicarage Rape Victim
 Mia Soteriou, (Maria Soteriou) – actress and musician

Grammar school
Nadine Baylis (1940-2017), stage and costume designer
 Betty Birch, England cricketer (1951-1958), pupil and PE teacher at the school
 Barbara Boxall, Editor from 1964–74 of Woman, and from 1962–64 of Woman's Realm
 Diana Garnham, Board member Construction Industry Training Board (CITB), Chief Executive 2006 – October 2015 of the Science Council, and from 1991–2005 of the Association of Medical Research Charities (AMRC)
 Kelly Hunter – actress
 Nigella Lawson (briefly) and her sister Horatia
 Janet Street-Porter — editor-at-large at the Independent newspapers

References

External links

 

Girls' schools in London
Secondary schools in the London Borough of Hammersmith and Fulham
Church of England secondary schools in the Diocese of London
Academies in the London Borough of Hammersmith and Fulham
Grade II listed buildings in the London Borough of Hammersmith and Fulham
Houses in the London Borough of Hammersmith and Fulham
Fulham
Educational institutions established in 1917
1917 establishments in England
King's Road, Chelsea, London